Thoksela is a village development committee in Okhaldhunga District in the Sagarmatha Zone of mid-eastern Nepal. At the time of the 1991 Nepal census it had a population of 2128 living in 651 individual households.

References

External links
UN map of the municipalities of Okhaldhunga District

Populated places in Okhaldhunga District